Jérémy Comte is a Canadian film director from Quebec. He is best known for his 2018 short film Fauve which has won a Special Jury Prize at the 2018 Sundance Film Festival and was nominated for 91st Academy Awards.

Life and career
Comte grew up in Sherbrooke, Quebec. He graduated from Concordia University, Montreal, majoring in film production at 2013. At the age of 18, Comte made his first short documentary named Feel The Hill. Comte also directed the documentary short films Rueda and Paths and the narrative short film Ce qu'il reste (What Remains).

After directing student films at in Concordia, Comte made his first two fictional short films, the second of which was Fauve (2018). Shot in 2017, the film centres on two boys (Félix Grenier and Alexandre Perreault) looking for adventure near an open pit mine, who are soon drawn into a dangerous situation as their power game spins out of control.

The film premiered at the 2018 Sundance Film Festival and won a Special Jury Prize. It won several awards at other film festivals throughout the year, including the top award at the Palm Springs International Festival of Short Films, an Honourable Mention from the Best Canadian Short Film jury at the 2018 Toronto International Film Festival, and the Grand Jury Prize at the 24FPS International Short Film Festival. It was later nominated for the Academy Award for Best Live Action Short Film at the 91st Academy Awards. In 2018, it was named to TIFF's annual year-end Canada's Top Ten list.

References

External links

Living people
Film directors from Quebec
People from Sherbrooke
Directors of Genie and Canadian Screen Award winners for Best Live Action Short Drama
Year of birth missing (living people)